Victor Saul Miller (born 3 March 1947 in Brooklyn, New York) is an American mathematician in the Statistics and Privacy Group of Meta Platforms. He received his B.A. in mathematics from Columbia University in 1968, and his Ph.D. in mathematics from Harvard University in 1975.  He was an assistant professor in the Mathematics Department of the University of Massachusetts Boston from 1973 to 1978.  In 1978 he joined the IBM 801 project in the Computer Science Department of the Thomas J. Watson Research Center in Yorktown Heights, New York, and moved to the Mathematics Department in 1984.  From 1993-2022 he was on the Research Staff of Center for Communications Research (CCR) of the Institute for Defense Analyses in Princeton, New Jersey, U.S.

From 1984 through 1987 he was the editor of SIGACT news.

His main areas of interest are in computational number theory, combinatorics, data compression and cryptography.  He is one of the co-inventors of elliptic-curve cryptography. He is also one of the co-inventors, with Mark Wegman, of the LZW data compression algorithm, and various extensions, one of which is used in the V.42bis international modem standard.  He received an IEEE Millennium medal for this invention. He is also the inventor of Miller's Algorithm<ref>V. Miller Short Programs for functions on curves", unpublished manuscript (1986)</ref> which is of fundamental use in pairing-based cryptography.  He is also one of the co-inventors of the Lagarias-Miller-Odlyzko'' prime counting algorithm.

Miller is the recipient of the Certicom Recognition Award, the RSA Award for Excellence in Mathematics which was given in the RSA Conference 2009, the Eduard Rhein Stiftung Technology Award for 2020  and the Levchin Prize  all for the invention of Elliptic Curve Cryptography. He is a Life Fellow of the IEEE, and a Fellow of the International Association for Cryptologic Research and the Association for Computing Machinery. He is also a member of Information Systems Security Association Hall of Fame

References

External links
Miller's Weil Pairing Algorithm

1947 births
Living people
Harvard University alumni
Columbia College (New York) alumni
20th-century American mathematicians
21st-century American mathematicians
Modern cryptographers
IBM employees
Fellow Members of the IEEE
Fellows of the Association for Computing Machinery
University of Massachusetts Boston faculty